Muricopsis fusiformis is a species of sea snail, a marine gastropod mollusk in the family Muricidae, the murex snails or rock snails.

Subspecies 
 Muricopsis fusiformis punctata Houart, 1990

Description

Distribution
This marine species occurs off Senegal

References

 Houart, R., 1990. Description of two new subspecies of Muricopsis (Risomurex) (Muricidae: Muricopsinae) from Angola, western Africa. Publicacoes Ocasionais da Sociedade Portuguesa de Malacologia 15: 53–58

External links
 Gmelin J.F. (1791). Vermes. In: Gmelin J.F. (Ed.) Caroli a Linnaei Systema Naturae per Regna Tria Naturae, Ed. 13. Tome 1(6). G.E. Beer, Lipsiae (Leipzig). pp. 3021-3910
 Maltzan H. F. von. (1884). Diagnosen neuer Senegambischer Gastropoden. Nachrichtsblatt der Deutschen Malakozooologischen Gesellschaft, 16: 65-73

Muricidae
Gastropods described in 1791